Lochmaeocles callidryas is a species of beetle in the family Cerambycidae, also known by the common name of twig girdler.  It was described by Henry Walter Bates in 1865. It is known from Peru, Brazil, French Guiana, Ecuador, Guyana, Suriname, Bolivia, and Venezuela.

References

callidryas
Beetles described in 1865